James Timothy Daly (born March 1, 1956) is an American actor. He is known for his role as Joe Hackett on the NBC sitcom Wings and his recurring role as the drug-addicted screenwriter J.T. Dolan on The Sopranos (for which he was nominated for an Emmy Award). He starred as Pete Wilder on the ABC medical drama Private Practice from 2007 to 2012. He's also known as his voice role as Clark Kent/Superman in Superman: The Animated Series. From 2014 until 2019, he portrayed Henry McCord, husband of the Secretary of State, on the CBS drama Madam Secretary.

Early life

Daly was born March 1, 1956, at Mount Sinai Hospital in Manhattan, the only son and youngest of four children of actor James Daly (1918–1978) and actress Mary Hope Daly (1921–2009). He is of Irish descent, his ancestors being from Limerick and Kerry. He is the younger brother of actress Tyne Daly. He has two other sisters, Mary Glynn (wife of Mark Snow) and Pegeen Michael. Daly attended The Putney School, where he started to study acting.

Daly began his professional career while a student at Vermont's Bennington College, where he studied Theatre and Literature, acted in summer stock, and earned a Bachelor of Arts degree. He graduated from college in 1979, and returned to New York to continue studying acting and singing.

Career
Daly debuted on stage when he was seven years old in Jenny Kissed Me by Jean Kerr, together with his parents and two sisters. He appeared for the first time on TV when he was 10 years old in an American Playhouse adaptation of An Enemy of the People by Henrik Ibsen, which starred his father James Daly. He dreamed about a sports or music career and also considered becoming a doctor or a lawyer, but finally decided to become an actor. Daly started his professional acting career when he appeared in a 1978 adaptation of Peter Shaffer's play Equus.

His first leading film role was in the film Diner, directed by Barry Levinson, in which he shared screen time with actors including Kevin Bacon and Mickey Rourke. Starring roles soon followed in Alan Rudolph's feature, Made in Heaven, the American Playhouse production of The Rise & Rise of Daniel Rocket, and the CBS dramatic series, Almost Grown created by David Chase.

In theatre he has starred in the Broadway production of Coastal Disturbances by playwright Tina Howe opposite Annette Bening and received a 1987 Theatre World Award for his performance. He has also starred in Oliver, Oliver at the Manhattan Theatre Club, Mass Appeal by Bill C. Davis and Bus Stop by William Inge at Trinity Repertory Company, The Glass Menagerie by Tennessee Williams at the Santa Fe Festival Theatre, A Knife in the Heart and A Study in Scarlet at the Williamstown Playhouse, and Paris Bound at the Berkshire Theatre Festival.  During this time, Daly also starred in the CBS television miniseries I'll Take Manhattan as Toby Amberville.

Daly describes himself as being highly self-critical in regard to his career. In an interview with New Zealand 'ZM' radio personality Polly Gillespie, Daly was quoted as saying, "I think part of it (his self-critical nature) is passed down to me from my parents who are actors. The theatre was our temple... When you entered you were expected to live up to the example of this glorious place."

1990s
Wings is an American sitcom that ran on NBC from April 19, 1990, to May 14, 1997. It starred Daly and Steven Weber as brothers Joe and Brian Hackett. The show was set at Tom Nevers Field, a small airport in Nantucket, Massachusetts, where the Hackett brothers operated the one-plane airline, Sandpiper Air.

In 1993, he gave a much-respected performance as David Koresh in In the Line of Duty: Ambush in Waco (TV), though the film itself was controversial because it was already in production while the Waco standoff was still on-going.

Daly also became noted for voicing Clark Kent/Superman in Superman: The Animated Series during this time.

In 1997, he and J. Todd Harris formed Daly-Harris Productions, through which he produced such films as: Execution of Justice (1999) (TV), Urbania (2000) and Tick Tock (2000). In 1998, Daly appeared in several episodes of the Emmy award-winning, Tom Hanks-produced HBO mini-series From the Earth to the Moon playing astronaut Jim Lovell, whom Hanks himself had portrayed in the film Apollo 13.

2000s
During the 2000–2001 television season, Daly starred as Dr. Richard Kimble in a remake of the classic television series The Fugitive.  The series lasted only one season.

In 2002, Daly guest-starred as himself in the TV series Monk in the episode "Mr. Monk and the Airplane", briefly reuniting him with his Wings castmate Tony Shalhoub. In 2006, Daly returned to Broadway when he appeared on stage opposite David Schwimmer and Željko Ivanek in the Broadway revival of The Caine Mutiny Court Martial. Daly made several appearances on The Sopranos as J.T. Dolan, an AA buddy of Christopher Moltisanti (Michael Imperioli). Daly received a 2007 Emmy nomination for his work on the series. He appeared on the midseason ABC crime series Eyes, which got good reviews but was canceled after only five episodes. In 2006, Daly played the role of Nick Cavanaugh on the new ABC drama The Nine. From 2007 to 2012, Daly played a love interest for Kate Walsh's character on the TV series Private Practice.

As a voice-actor, Daly portrayed superhero Superman and his alter ego Clark Kent in Superman: The Animated Series (1996–2000), but was unable to return as Superman (thus being replaced by Christopher McDonald in Batman Beyond and George Newbern in Justice League and Justice League Unlimited), as he was under contract to star in a remake of the 1960s TV drama The Fugitive. He reprised his role as Superman in the video game Superman: Shadow of Apokolips and the direct-to-video releases Superman: Brainiac Attacks, Superman/Batman: Public Enemies, Superman/Batman: Apocalypse and Justice League: Doom. Daly reprised his role as Superman in an animated remake of the trailer for the 2013 film Man of Steel by the Hub Network to celebrate the release of the film and to promote the network's upcoming marathon of Superman episodes.

Daly heads Red House Entertainment. Films produced through the company include Edge of America, which won a  Peabody Award and a Humanitas Prize, and Daly's directing debut, the independent film Bereft. Daly also created Wandering Bark Productions, based at Paramount Pictures, a company designed to develop and produce a variety of film, television and theater projects. The company's producing credits include the Los Angeles premiere of Vincent J. Cardinal's play A Colorado Catechism, starring Daly. The play received favorable reviews and earned Daly the Drama-Logue Award for Best Actor. Daly co-produced a documentary, PoliWood, about the 2008 Democratic and Republican National Conventions. The documentary, directed by Barry Levinson had its premiere at the 2009 Tribeca Film Festival.

In 2014, Daly guest starred in recurring roles on The Mindy Project and Hot in Cleveland. From mid-2014 until 2019, he played Henry McCord, the husband of the title character on the TV series Madam Secretary.

In 2015, Daly reprised his role as Superman for Justice League: Battle for Metropolis, an interactive dark ride found at seven different Six Flags theme parks across the United States and Mexico.

Non-profit work
Daly is an activist in various liberal political and social causes.

In the beginning of 2007, Daly became a member of The Creative Coalition (TCC), a nonprofit, (501(c)(3)) liberal, politically active group formed of members of the American film entertainment industry; since 2008, Daly has served as President of the Creative Coalition. As a member of TCC Daly has joined the National Task Force on Children's Safety, a program co-founded by The Creative Coalition and Safety4Kids, "the first children's media brand focused solely on safety and health." According to the program website: "The Task Force is the first critical step in creating a national dialogue on safety and media literacy and determining next steps to ensure that the issues are prioritized in the minds of parents, educators and legislators." "The Task Force is dedicated to awareness, education and lasting change by impacting national policy on safety education and media literacy." In August 2007, Daly became one of the three chairs for the organization's activity at the 2008 Democratic and Republican conventions. Along with actress Kerry Washington and writer/director Sue Kramer, Daly was responsible for leading "TCC's Convention efforts designed to bring issues of importance to the forefront of the 2008 presidential campaign." In November 2007, Daly interviewed Senator John Edwards, one of the Democratic presidential candidates.

In June 2008, Daly, together with Chandra Wilson, was named the 2008 ambassador for Lee National Denim Day – a fundraiser for breast cancer, benefiting the Women's Cancer Programs of the Entertainment Industry Foundation. In August 2008, Daly was named co-president of the Creative Coalition, a liberal group that works on issues such as health care reform and arts funding.

Personal life
Daly married actress Amy Van Nostrand in 1982. They have two children, including Sam. In Madam Secretary, his son played the ex-fiancé of main character Daisy Grant and his daughter played the niece of his character Henry McCord. She graduated from Barnard College in 2011 and was a Fulbright scholar to Brazil. In 2010, Daly and Van Nostrand divorced. He has been dating his Madam Secretary co-star Téa Leoni since December 2014.

In 2012, Daly climbed Mount Kilimanjaro. That same year, he and his sister Tyne endorsed the re-election campaign of Democratic U.S. President Barack Obama. Daly was in the Virgin America first-class lounge during the 2013 Los Angeles International Airport shooting. In January 2017, Daly broke both legs in a ski accident while on vacation in Sundance.

Filmography

Film

Television

Producer credits

Theatre

Broadway

Off-Broadway

Other stage credits

Awards and nominations

References

External links

 
 
 
 
 
 
 

1956 births
Living people
20th-century American male actors
21st-century American male actors
American film producers
American male film actors
American male stage actors
American male television actors
American male video game actors
American male voice actors
Bennington College alumni
Male actors from New York City
Television producers from New York City
The Putney School alumni
Waldorf school alumni